Yockletts Bank is a  biological Site of Special Scientific Interest west of Stelling Minnis in Kent. It is managed by KWT and is part of Kent Downs Area of Outstanding Natural Beauty.

This sloping site has woodland on dry chalk soils. There are diverse woodland breeding birds, and the ground flora is dominated by bluebells, but there are also many orchids.

There is access from the road called Gogway, which runs through the site.

References

Kent Wildlife Trust
Sites of Special Scientific Interest in Kent